This is a complete list of current bridges and other crossings of the Green River in Kentucky from the Ohio River northeast of Henderson, Kentucky upstream through to the main source in western Lincoln County.

Crossings

See also 
List of crossings of the Ohio River

References
Main references: Google Earth Imagery, July 2011 

River crossings
Green River
Crossings